Guangfu Road (meaning "recover"; also called 13th Ave.) is a major arterial in Taipei, Taiwan, which connects the Songshan district in the north with the Xinyi district in the south.  The road travels through mostly residential areas with very few retail complexes.  Despite the quiet surroundings, Guangfu Road is very congested, especially during rush hour.  The road connects Songshan Airport and neighboring aviation companies with the residential areas of Songshan with several major arterials with connections to several large highways and the bustling commercial heart of the Xinyi district.  Notable landmarks along Guangfu Road includes:

 Songshan Airport
 Songshan Army Hospital

Sections 
Unlike other arterials in Taipei, Guangfu Road is only divided into directional sections with no smaller numbered sections.
 North section : Minquan East Road Sec. 4 - Bade Road Sec. 3-4
 South section : Bade Road Sec. 3-4 - Keelung Road Sec. 2

Major intersections

Guangfu North Road
 Minquan East Road Sec. 4
 Minsheng East Road Sec. 4-5
 Jiankang Road
 Nanjing East Road Sec. 5
 Bade Road Sec. 3-4

Guangfu South Road
 Bade Road Sec. 3-4
 Civic Blvd. Sec. 4-5
 Zhongxiao East Road Sec. 4
 Renai Road Sec. 4
 Xinyi Road Sec. 4
 Keelung Road Sec. 2

See also
 List of roads in Taiwan

Streets in Taipei